No Label 2 is the fourth mixtape by American hip hop group Migos, released on February 25, 2014. It features production by Zaytoven, Metro Boomin, TM88 and Da Honorable CNOTE, among others, and guest appearances by Meek Mill, Rich Homie Quan, Machine Gun Kelly, Young Thug and Jermaine Dupri  . The tape, which was preceded by the single "Ounces", is a sequel to their 2012 No Label. "Fight Night" peaked at number 69 on the US Billboard Hot 100 chart, becoming the group's most successful single at the time.

Reception 
Upon its release, No Label 2 was met with generally positive reviews from music critics. Consequence of Sound described it as "the perfect mix of raucous party tunes and triumphant rap anthems for your next BBQ or block party" and Exclaim! commented that it "is packed with potential hits." Vibe also praised the production on the tape, calling it "extensive and impressive". Complex named it the twenty-first best album of the first half of 2014.

In June 2014, No Label 2 was remastered with six songs less. This version has a different cover and another single on the track listing, "New Atlanta" featuring Rich Homie Quan, Young Thug, and Jermaine Dupri.

Track listing

References

2014 mixtape albums
Albums produced by Zaytoven
Sequel albums
Albums produced by Honorable C.N.O.T.E.
Albums produced by Metro Boomin
Albums produced by Murda Beatz
Migos albums
Quality Control Music albums